The Suzuki MR Wagon is a 4-seater kei car manufactured by Suzuki for the Japanese market only, and also marketed in Japan by Nissan as the Nissan Moco under an OEM agreement. The model debuted in 2001, and since 2011 it has been in its third generation. The first generation was also produced and sold in India by Maruti Suzuki as Maruti Zen Estilo, which was launched in 2006, Maruti Zen Estilo was discontinued in 2009 and renamed as Maruti Estilo.

The vehicle's name is somewhat misleading, as it does not sport a rear mid-engine, rear-wheel-drive layout (which is often abbreviated as RMR, or more commonly, MR); it stands for "Magical Relax".



First generation (MF21S; 2001) 

After appearing at the 33rd Tokyo Motor Show in 1999, the first generation model went on sale on December 4, 2001, featuring Suzuki's K6A kei car engine, in either naturally aspirated or turbocharged versions, available with either front-wheel drive or all-wheel drive. Torque figures are  respectively. In all versions, the transmission was a four-speed transmission with column shift. A hydrogen-powered fuel cell vehicle based on the first-generation MR Wagon was presented in 2005, using technology co-developed with General Motors.

Later turbocharged versions develop the maximum  allowed by kei car regulations, and have  of torque.

The Nissan Moco version was presented as a concept car on the 35th Tokyo Motor Show in October 2001 and then went on sale on April 10, 2002. The basic engine, drive and transmission choices were the same as for the Suzuki. The major difference between the Nissan and Suzuki versions was the Nissan's "wing" grille resembling that of the contemporary P12 Primera. The sales of the Nissan version stabilized at about 3,000-4,000 units a month, actually exceeding the MR Wagon's sales.

Indian market (MF31S)
The first generation model went on sale in India in December 2006 as the Maruti Suzuki Zen Estilo, supposedly to increase differentiation from the Maruti Suzuki Alto.

2009 facelift
A facelifted variant was released in August 2009 as the Maruti Suzuki Estilo, losing the Zen moniker entirely. This transition has brought about a steady decline in sales, though the facelift brought significant improvements in performance and styling over the car's Japanese variants. This model also sported a slightly stiffer rear three-link suspension setup in an effort to curb body roll and improve stability at high speed. Features such as rear fog light, rear defroster, new instrument console and new interior colors were also added to enhance appeal.

In February 2014, the Estilo was discontinued in order to make room for the Celerio hatchback.

Indonesian market
The first generation model, sold in Indonesia as the Suzuki Karimun Estilo, replaced the first-generation Wagon R-based Suzuki Karimun. Sales began in 2007 with the units imported from Maruti Suzuki India. A facelifted variant was released in late 2009. Sales of the Karimun Estilo were discontinued in late 2012. In October 2013, the Karimun Wagon R replaced the Karimun Estilo.

Second generation (MF22S; 2006) 

The model's second generation was previewed at the 39th Tokyo Motor Show in 2005, where a concept called Mom's Personal Wagon was presented, with many features intended to be useful for a mother driving her children, including food trays, a front bench seat and pillarless suicide doors on the left side (which is the curb side in Japan). None of those would eventually make it to the actual MR Wagon, which went on sale on January 20 (Moco on February 1) the following year, while on the other hand the model features the new keyless entry and start system. The engine, drive and shifter choice remained the same, with the same availability in both Nissan and Suzuki versions, but the gear shifter is now located on the instrument panel. As with the first generation, the cars are almost identical in outside appearance, but have different front end designs.

This generation of the MR Wagon has the MF22S chassis code; the engines remain the K6A family units. This generation was not built or marketed outside of Japan.

Third generation (MF33S; 2011)

The third generation of the MR Wagon was launched in Japan on January 20, 2011. It carries the MF33S chassis code. A month later the Nissan Moco followed. It has the all new Suzuki R engine, which features variable valve timing and an unusually high compression ratio (11.0:1 for the naturally aspirated version).

As of 2013, the engines have been modified, and now features stop-start and other technology intended to lower consumption and emissions. This is the most fuel efficient wagon in the Kei class. In July 2013, the MR Wagon Wit, a better equipped model with a more traditional chromed grille, was introduced. The turbo engine is now restricted to the Wit TS, with all other versions offering the NA engine (L, X, Wit LS, Wit XS).

In December 2015, Suzuki announced that the MR Wagon would end its production. Sales of the MR Wagon ended on March 31, 2016, but the Nissan Moco sales ended on May 31, 2016.

References 

  (technical data in infoboxes)
 The article incorporates text translated from the corresponding Japanese Wikipedia articles on the Suzuki MR Wagon and Nissan Moco as of January 25, 2007.

External links 

 Suzuki MR Wagon at the official manufacturer's site 
 Nissan Moco at the official manufacturer's site 

Front-wheel-drive vehicles
All-wheel-drive vehicles
Hatchbacks
Kei cars
City cars
MR Wagon
Cars introduced in 2001
Cars discontinued in 2016
2010s cars
Vehicles with CVT transmission